, officially called  was an old province of Japan in the area of Iwate and Aomori prefecture.

In the Meiji era, the province was cut down to cover only present-day Aomori and given the new name Rikuō Province, which retained the original kanji.

History
On December 7, 1868 (January 19, 1869 in the Gregorian calendar), four additional provinces (Rikuchū, Rikuzen, Iwaki, and Iwashiro) were separated from Mustsu, leaving only a rump corresponding to today's Aomori Prefecture (with Ninohe District of Iwate Prefecture). At the same time, while the characters of the name were unchanged, the official reading was changed to the on'yomi version "Rikuō".

Historical districts
 Aomori Prefecture
 Tsugaru District (津軽郡)
 Higashitsugaru District (東津軽郡)
 Kitatsugaru District (北津軽郡)
 Minamitsugaru District (南津軽郡)
 Nakatsugaru District (中津軽郡)
 Nishitsugaru District (西津軽郡)
 Kita District (北郡)
 Kamikita District (上北郡)
 Shimokita District (下北郡)
 Sannohe District (三戸郡)
 Iwate Prefecture
 Ninohe District (二戸郡)

See also
 Mutsu Province
 Sanriku
 Tōhoku region
 Tōsandō
 , the World War II Imperial Japanese Navy warship named after the province.

Notes

References
 Nussbaum, Louis-Frédéric and Käthe Roth. (2005).  Japan encyclopedia. Cambridge: Harvard University Press. ;  OCLC 58053128
 Titsingh, Isaac. (1834).  Annales des empereurs du Japon (Nihon Odai Ichiran).  Paris: Royal Asiatic Society, Oriental Translation Fund of Great Britain and Ireland. OCLC 5850691.

Other websites

  Murdoch's map of provinces, 1903
 

Former provinces of Japan